The list of ship decommissionings in 1879 includes a chronological list of all ships decommissioned in 1879.


See also 

1879
 Ship decommissionings